HD 221287, named Poerava, is a star in the southern constellation of Tucana. It has a yellow-white hue but is too faint to be viewed with the naked eye, having an apparent visual magnitude of 7.82. This object is located at a distance of 183 light years from the Sun, as determined from its parallax. It is drifting closer with a radial velocity of −22 km/s.

This object is an F-type main-sequence star with a stellar classification of F7V. It is relatively young with age estimates of 763 million and 1.3 billion years, and possesses an active chromosphere. Cool spots on the surface are generating a radial-velocity signal that is modulated by the rotation period of around five days. The star is 18% larger and 20% more massive than the Sun. It is radiating 1.9 times the luminosity of the Sun from its photosphere at an effective temperature of 6,440 K.

Name 
The star was given the designation "HD 221287" before being named Poerava by representatives of the Cook Islands in the IAU's 2019 NameExoWorlds contest, with the comment "Poerava is the word in the Cook Islands Maori language for a large mystical black pearl of utter beauty and perfection."

Planetary system
On March 5, 2007, the astronomer Dominique Naef used the HARPS spectrograph to uncover the exoplanetary companion designated HD 221287 b (among others). Using the amplitude from observations with HARPS, he calculated a minimum mass of 3.12 times that of Jupiter, making this a superjovian. This planet orbits 25% further from the star than Earth is from the Sun, with a low eccentricity.

Stability analysis reveals that the orbits of Earth–sized planets in HD 221287 b's Trojan points, located 60 degrees ahead and behind the planet in its orbit, would be stable for long periods of time.

See also
 HD 100777
 HD 164595
 HD 190647

References

F-type main-sequence stars
Planetary systems with one confirmed planet
Tucana (constellation)
Durchmusterung objects
221287
116084
Poerava